The São Miguel goldcrest (Regulus regulus azoricus), Estrelinha-de-poupa in Portuguese, is a very small passerine bird in the kinglet family.  One of several goldcrest insular subspecies in the North Atlantic archipelagos of Macaronesia, it is endemic to São Miguel in the Azores where it is a non-migratory resident.

References

São Miguel goldcrest
Birds of the Azores
Endemic fauna of the Azores
São Miguel goldcrest